The 2014 Cholet Pays de Loire Dames was the 11th edition of a one-day women's cycle race held in Cholet, France on 23 March 2014. The race has an UCI rating of 1.2. The race was won by the Swedish rider Emma Johansson riding for a Swedish national selection team.

Results

See also
 2014 in women's road cycling

References

Cholet Pays de Loire Dames
Cholet Pays de Loire Dames
Cholet Pays de Loire Dames